Rafael Santiago Maria or simply Santiago (born August 10, 1984) is a Brazilian football player currently playing for Esporte Clube Pelotas.

External links
  Profile at ogol.com.br

1984 births
Living people
Brazilian footballers
Brazilian expatriate footballers
Paraná Clube players
Operário Ferroviário Esporte Clube players
Budapest Honvéd FC players
Iraty Sport Club players
A.F.C. Tubize players
Associação Chapecoense de Futebol players
Sociedade Esportiva e Recreativa Caxias do Sul players
ABC Futebol Clube players
Esporte Clube Pelotas players
Expatriate footballers in Hungary
Expatriate footballers in Belgium
Association football forwards
Footballers from Curitiba